Maha Sati Savitri is a 1973 Hindi mythological film directed by Chandrakant. The film stars Jayshree Gadkar and Upendra Trivedi.

Cast
Jayshree Gadkar ...  Rajkumari Savitri
Upendra Trivedi ...  Satyavan
Meena T. ...  Rajkumari Sukanya
Ratnamala ...  Maharani Malvi
Anuradha
Ashwani Kumar
D.K. Sapru ...  Bhagwan Shri Yamraj (as Sapru)
Prabha Desai
Kalpana Divan
Arvind Pandya
Amrit Patel ...  Rajkumar
Radheshyam
Rani
Arvind Rathod ...  Maharaj Ashvapati
Shribhagwan
Sujata
Kumud Tripathi

Songs
All songs were written by Kavi Pradeep.

"Chupke Chupke Chupchap" - Mahendra Kapoor, Asha Bhosle
"Hansa Rana Na Jao Chod Ke" - Asha Bhosle
"Meri Dunia Badal Gayi Aaj Re" - Asha Bhosle
"Naino Ki Kothari Saja Ke" - Asha Bhosle
"Yeh Bharat Hai Ratnon Ki Khani" - Mahendra Kapoor 
"Ek Chamatkar Hai Yeh" - Mahendra Kapoor 
"Ek Ganga Kahin Se Aayi" - Mahendra Kapoor 
"Mera Kar Do Amar Suhaag" - Vani Jairam, Suman Kalyanpur

External links
 

1973 films
1970s Hindi-language films
1970s fantasy films
Films about Savitri and Satyavan
Films scored by Avinash Vyas
Films based on the Mahabharata